Peltoniemi is a Finnish surname. Notable people with the surname include:

 Teuvo Peltoniemi (born 1950), Finnish writer, journalist, researcher, and educator
 Asko Peltoniemi (born 1963), Finnish pole vaulter

Finnish-language surnames